Pseudoboletia is a genus of sea urchins.

Species

References

External links

 
Echinoidea genera